The 1925 U.S. Figure Skating Championships was held from February 13 to 15 in New York.

Senior results

Men

Ladies

Beatrix Loughran built a lead in the school figures to win her first national title, holding off five-time champion Theresa Weld Blanchard.

Pairs

Junior results

Men

Ladies

Pairs

Sources
 "The United States National Figure Skating Championships", Skating magazine, May 1925

U.S. Figure Skating Championships
United States Figure Skating Championships, 1925
United States Figure Skating Championships, 1925
February 1925 sports events